In enzymology, a D-ornithine 4,5-aminomutase is an enzyme that catalyzes the chemical reaction

D-ornithine  (2R,4S)-2,4-diaminopentanoate

Hence, this enzyme has one substrate, D-ornithine, and one product, (2R,4S)-2,4-diaminopentanoate.

This enzyme belongs to the family of isomerases, specifically those intramolecular transferases transferring amino groups.  The systematic name of this enzyme class is D-ornithine 4,5-aminomutase. Other names in common use include D-alpha-ornithine 5,4-aminomutase, and D-ornithine aminomutase.  This enzyme participates in d-arginine and d-ornithine metabolism.  It has 3 cofactors: pyridoxal phosphate, Cobamide coenzyme,  and Dithiothreitol.

References

 

EC 5.4.3
Pyridoxal phosphate enzymes
Enzymes of unknown structure